The Substance is an upcoming American body horror film written and directed by Coralie Fargeat, and starring Demi Moore and Margaret Qualley.

Cast
Demi Moore
Margaret Qualley
Ray Liotta

Production
In January 2022, it was announced that Moore and Qualley will star in the film.  In February 2022, it was announced that Liotta joined the cast of the film.

Filming was slated to begin in Paris in May 2022.

In May 2022, it was reported that the status of production on the film was unknown due to Liotta’s death.  On June 9 that same year, PopCulture.com reported that the decision to recast Liotta's character has not been confirmed yet.  Also that same day, Good Morning America reported that The Substance is still in production.

In August 2022, Deadline Hollywood reported that the film is "currently in production."  Later that same month, Qualley confirmed in an interview with W that she was currently doing work on the film.

References

External links
 

Upcoming films
Universal Pictures films
Working Title Films films
Films produced by Tim Bevan
Films produced by Eric Fellner